Barrow is a village and civil parish in the Ribble Valley district in Lancashire, England, situated between Whalley and Clitheroe and bypassed by the A59.  It has a primary school, a Chinese takeaway and two parks. The village is well served by local bus routes, giving direct access to many parts of Lancashire. New development has taken place in the area between Whalley Road (the former route of the A59) and the bypass.

It is the birthplace of Lancashire and England cricketer Cyril Washbrook, and there are two streets in the village in his name.

According to the United Kingdom Census 2011, 646 people lived in the built-up area of Barrow village.

Barrow Parish Council was created in 2015, previously the village was in Wiswell civil parish.

Along with Wiswell, Pendleton, Mearley and Worston, the parish forms the Wiswell and Pendleton ward of Ribble Valley Borough Council.

References

Villages in Lancashire
Civil parishes in Lancashire
Geography of Ribble Valley